Stars and Bars is a 1988 American comedy film directed by Pat O'Connor and starring Daniel Day-Lewis. It is based on William Boyd's 1984 book of the same name.

Premise

A British art expert, Henderson Dores, travels across the Southern United States in order to purchase a rare painting by Pierre-Auguste Renoir. He comes across some crazy characters in the process.

Cast

 Daniel Day-Lewis as Henderson Dores
 Harry Dean Stanton as Loomis Gage
 Kent Broadhurst as Ben Sereno
 Maury Chaykin as Freeborn Gage
 Matthew Cowles as Beckman Gage
 Joan Cusack as Irene Stein
 Keith David as Eugene Teagarden
 Spalding Gray as Reverend T.J. Cardew
 Glenne Headly as Cora Gage
 Laurie Metcalf as Melissa
 Bill Moor as Edgar Beeby
 Deirdre O'Connell as Shanda Gage
 Will Patton as Duane Gage
 Martha Plimpton as Bryant
 Rockets Redglare as Peter Gint
 Beatrice Winde as Alma-May
 Steven Wright as Pruitt
 David Strathairn as Charlie

References

External links
 
 
 

1988 films
American comedy films
1988 comedy films
Films directed by Pat O'Connor
Columbia Pictures films
Films with screenplays by William Boyd (writer)
Films scored by Stanley Myers
Films based on British novels
1980s English-language films
1980s American films